Söyüdlü (also, Segyutlyu, Sëyudlyu, Sogyutlu, and Sogyutlyu) is a village and municipality in the Gadabay Rayon of Azerbaijan.  It has a population of 2,372.

References 

Populated places in Gadabay District